Erma Bossi  (1875-1952) was an Italian German Expressionist painter.

Biography
Bossi was born in 1875 in Pula. She studied art in Munich and was associated with Gabriele Münter and Wassily Kandinsky. She was a member of the Neue Künstlervereinigung München (Munich New Association of Artists).

She died in 1952 in Milan, Italy. Her work is in the collection of the Pinakothek der Moderne, the Kunsthalle Bremen, and the Kunsthalle Emden. In 2013 the Schlossmuseum Murnau held a retrospective of her work.

References

1875 births
1952 deaths
People from Pula
20th-century German women artists
19th-century German women artists